Burnaby was a provincial electoral district in the Canadian province of British Columbia that first appeared on the hustings in the 1924 election.  For the federal electoral district of the same name, please see Burnaby (electoral district).

Demographics

Political geography 
The riding was identical with the Municipality of Burnaby, other than areas near to New Westminster which were included in the New Westminster electoral district.  At the time of the riding's creation much of Burnaby was still semi-rural and development was confined to the Kingsway corridor (then "Westminster Highway"), along Hastings Street and Broadway (near Lougheed Highway), and along the two mainlines of the British Columbia Electric Railway via Central Park and Burnaby Lake.

Notable MLAs 
Ernest Edward Winch

Electoral history 
Note: Winners of each election are in bold.

|-

|Canadian Labour
|Francis Aubrey Browne
|align="right"|1,567
|align="right"|31.22%
|align="right"|
|align="right"|unknown

|Conservative
|Thomas Sanderson 
|align="right"|974	
|align="right"|19.40%
|align="right"|
|align="right"|unknown
|- bgcolor="white"
!align="right" colspan=3|Total valid votes
!align="right"|5,020 
!align="right"|100.00%
!align="right"|
|- bgcolor="white"
!align="right" colspan=3|Turnout
!align="right"|%
!align="right"|
!align="right"|
|}

|-

|Conservative
|Howard Wilfrid Clegg
|align="right"|2,307 	
|align="right"|17.19%
|align="right"|
|align="right"|unknown

|Independent
|Eleanor Walker Johnson
|align="right"|1,009 	
|align="right"|7.52%

|Independent
|Louis Elmo Walker
|align="right"|34 	
|align="right"|0.25%

|Co-operative Commonwealth Fed.
|Ernest Edward Winch
|align="right"|5,908
|align="right"|44.03%
|- bgcolor="white"
!align="right" colspan=3|Total valid votes
!align="right"|13,417
!align="right"|100.00%
!align="right"|
|- bgcolor="white"
!align="right" colspan=3|Total rejected ballots
!align="right"|121
|}

|Conservative
|Charles Clare Bell
|align="right"|2,707 	
|align="right"|20.79%

|Co-operative Commonwealth Fed.
|Ernest Edward Winch
|align="right"|6,444
|align="right"|49.50%
|- bgcolor="white"
!align="right" colspan=3|Total valid votes
!align="right"|13,018
|- bgcolor="white"
!align="right" colspan=3|Total rejected ballots
!align="right"|237
|}

|-

|(Mrs.) Lyle Campbell
|align="right"|298 	
|align="right"|2.55%
|align="right"|
|align="right"|unknown

|Co-operative Commonwealth Fed.
|Ernest Edward Winch
|align="right"|5,905 	
|align="right"|50.56%
|align="right"|
|align="right"|unknown
|- bgcolor="white"
!align="right" colspan=3|Total valid votes
!align="right"|11,680
!align="right"|100.00%
!align="right"|
|- bgcolor="white"
!align="right" colspan=3|Total rejected ballots
!align="right"|302
!align="right"|
!align="right"|
|- bgcolor="white"
!align="right" colspan=3|Turnout
!align="right"|%
!align="right"|
!align="right"|
|}

|-

|Co-operative Commonwealth
|Ernest Edward Winch
|align="right"|11,025	
|align="right"|50.90%
|align="right"|
|align="right"|unknown
|- bgcolor="white"
!align="right" colspan=3|Total valid votes
!align="right"|21,661
!align="right"|100.00%
!align="right"|
|- bgcolor="white"
!align="right" colspan=3|Total rejected ballots
!align="right"|204
!align="right"|
!align="right"|
|- bgcolor="white"
!align="right" colspan=3|Turnout
!align="right"|%
!align="right"|
!align="right"|
|}

|-

|Liberal
|Ronald William Fairclough
|align="right"|3,816                   
|align="right"|14.15%  
|align="right"|4,919
|align="right"|18.84% 
|align="right"|
|align="right"|unknown

|Progressive Conservative
|Oscar Rudolph Olson
|align="right"|2,807                    
|align="right"|10.41% 
|align="right"| -  
|align="right"| -.- % 
|align="right"|
|align="right"|unknown

|Co-operative Commonwealth Fed.
|Ernest Edward Winch
|align="right"|12,933
|align="right"|47.96% 
|align="right"|13,416
|align="right"|51.37%
|align="right"|
|align="right"|unknown

|- bgcolor="white"
!align="right" colspan=3|Total valid votes
!align="right"|26,968                
!align="right"|%
!align="right"|26,115       
!align="right"|100.00%
!align="right"|
|- bgcolor="white"
!align="right" colspan=3|Total rejected ballots
!align="right"|789
!align="right"|
!align="right"|
|- bgcolor="white"
!align="right" colspan=3|Turnout
!align="right"|%
!align="right"|
!align="right"|
|- bgcolor="white"
!align="right" colspan=9|1 Preferential ballot; only one count necessary due to majority on first count.
|}	  	

|Liberal
|Mary Edith McDonald
|align="right"|3,351 	 	 	 	 	     
|align="right"|13.09% 
|align="right"|3,364
|align="right"|13.18% 
|align="right"|
|align="right"|unknown

|Progressive Conservative
|Frederick Marven Stephens
|align="right"|641 	 	 		 		
|align="right"|2.50%
|align="right"|646 
|align="right"|2.53%
|align="right"|
|align="right"|unknown

|Co-operative Commonwealth Fed.
|Ernest Edward Winch	 	 	
|align="right"|12,689 	 	 	  
|align="right"|49.58% 
|align="right"|12,947 	 	 
|align="right"|50.73%
|align="right"|
|align="right"|unknown

|- bgcolor="white"
!align="right" colspan=3|Total valid votes
!align="right"|25,595 	  		 	  	 		  	       
!align="right"|100.00%
!align="right"|25,519   
!align="right"|%
!align="right"|
|- bgcolor="white"
!align="right" colspan=3|Total rejected ballots
!align="right"|1,058
!align="right"|
!align="right"|
!align="right"|
!align="right"|
|- bgcolor="white"
!align="right" colspan=3|Total Registered Voters
!align="right"|
!align="right"|
!align="right"|
!align="right"|
!align="right"|
|- bgcolor="white"
!align="right" colspan=3|Turnout
!align="right"|%
!align="right"|
!align="right"|
!align="right"|
!align="right"|
|- bgcolor="white"
!align="right" colspan=9|2 Preferential ballot; first and final of two (two) counts only shown.
|}

|-

|Co-operative Commonwealth Fed.
|Gordon Dowding
|align="right"|12,692
|align="right"|20.96%
|align="right"|
|align="right"|unknown

|Progressive Conservative
|John A.W. Drysdale
|align="right"|513 	 	 		 		
|align="right"|0.84%
|align="right"| - 
|align="right"|unknown

|Progressive Conservative
|Malcolm Fitzgerald Green
|align="right"|478 	 	 		 		
|align="right"|0.80%
|align="right"| - 
|align="right"|unknown

|Co-operative Commonwealth Fed.
|Ernest Edward Winch
|align="right"|15,304
|align="right"|25.28%
|align="right"|
|align="right"|unknown
|- bgcolor="white"
!align="right" colspan=3|Total valid votes
!align="right"|60,540 	
!align="right"|100.00%
!align="right"|
|- bgcolor="white"
!align="right" colspan=3|Total rejected ballots
!align="right"|236
!align="right"|
!align="right"|
|- bgcolor="white"
!align="right" colspan=3|Turnout
!align="right"|%
!align="right"|
!align="right"|
|- bgcolor="white"
!align="right" colspan=7|3  Seat increased to two members from one.
|}

|-

|Co-operative Commonwealth Fed.
|Cedric Cox
|align="right"|17,659
|align="right"|22.27%
|align="right"|
|align="right"|unknown

|Co-operative Commonwealth Fed.
|Gordon Dowding
|align="right"|17,522
|align="right"|22.09%
|align="right"|
|align="right"|unknown

|Progressive Conservative
|Malcolm Fitzgerald Green
|align="right"|1,069 	
|align="right"|1.35%
|align="right"|
|align="right"|unknown

|Progressive Conservative
|Florence B. Zucco
|align="right"|1,075 	
|align="right"|1.36%
|align="right"|
|align="right"|unknown
|- bgcolor="white"
!align="right" colspan=3|Total valid votes
!align="right"|79,309
!align="right"|100.00%
!align="right"|
|- bgcolor="white"
!align="right" colspan=3|Total rejected ballots
!align="right"|589
!align="right"|
!align="right"|
|- bgcolor="white"
!align="right" colspan=3|Turnout
!align="right"|%
!align="right"|
!align="right"|
|}

|-

|Co-operative Commonwealth Fed.
|Gordon Dowding
|align="right"|14,750
|align="right"|20.04%
|align="right"|
|align="right"|unknown

|Progressive Conservative
|Esmond Sibley Gladwin
|align="right"|2,263 	
|align="right"|3.07%
|align="right"|
|align="right"|unknown

|Progressive Conservative
|Christopher John McKin Thomson
|align="right"|2,343 	
|align="right"|3.18%
|align="right"|
|align="right"|unknown
|- bgcolor="white"
!align="right" colspan=3|Total valid votes
!align="right"|73,598 	
!align="right"|100.00%
!align="right"|
|- bgcolor="white"
!align="right" colspan=3|Total rejected ballots
!align="right"|20
!align="right"|
!align="right"|
|- bgcolor="white"
!align="right" colspan=3|Turnout
!align="right"|%
!align="right"|
!align="right"|
|}

The Burnaby riding was partitioned in the large redistribution prior to the 1966 election.  Successor ridings were Burnaby-Edmonds, Burnaby-Willingdon and Burnaby North.

Sources
Elections BC website - historical election data

Former provincial electoral districts of British Columbia
Politics of Burnaby